The 2012 Regional League Division 2 (also known as the AIS Regional League Division 2 for sponsorship reasons) was contested by the five regional league winners and runners up of the 3rd level championships of Thailand. The two best 3rd placed teams from the regional leagues also take part

Twelve teams were split into two groups of A & B, with the top two teams from group A & B gaining promotion to the Yamaha League-1 for the 2013 campaign, along with this, the two group winners would play off to determine the overall champions.

2012 Regional League table All locations

2012
red Zone:2012 Regional League Division 2 Bangkok Metropolitan Region
Yellow Zone:2012 Regional League Division 2 Central & Eastern Region 
Green Zone: 2012 Regional League Division 2 Northern Region Region 
  Orange Zone:2012 Regional League Division 2 North Eastern Region 
Blue Zone:2012 Regional League Division 2 Southern Region

List of qualified teams

Bangkok & field (2)
 Thai Honda  (Winner)
 Rayong United (Runner-up)

Central & Eastern (3)
 Ayutthaya (Winner)
 Rayong (Runner-up)
 Trat (3rd)

Northern (3)
 Chiangmai (Winner)
 Phitsanulok (Runner-up)
 Paknampho NSRU (3rd)

North Eastern (2)
 Roi Et United (Winner)
 Sisaket United (Runner-up)

Southern (2)
 Trang (Winner)
 Pattani (Runner-up, Winner Championship Pool Qualifying play-off)

Championship Pool Qualifying play-off

Champions League round table

Group A

Last updated December 9, 2012

Group B

3/4 Place

First Leg

Second Leg

Final
First Leg

Second Leg

Champions
The Regional Division 2 2012 winners were Ayutthaya.

External links
Thailand 2012 RSSSF

 
Thai League T4 seasons
3